Jumble winding or scramble winding is a type of winding of a wire randomly wound on a bobbin. In this type of winding, the wire is not wound layer by layer with insulation placed in between. In fact, it is wound full depth, and randomly until the number of turns have been reached. The only insulation throughout is the insulation on the wire and that of the bobbin. Special sectioned bobbins are used for this type of winding. Devices that use jumble-wound coils include small electric motors, and some types of choke inductors.

See also
 Coil winding technology#Wild winding

External links
 Article explaining the theory of inductance (mentions jumble winding)
 Glossary of Magnetics Manufacturing terms

Electromagnetic coils